From the state's creation August 10, 1821 until the end of the 29th United States Congress (in 1847), and also for the 73rd Congress (1933–1935), Missouri elected its members of the United States House of Representatives at-large statewide on a general ticket.

List of members representing the district

1821–1847: One seat, then two, then five

1933–1935: Thirteen seats

All seats elected at-large on a general ticket.

Notes

References 

 Election Statistics 1920-present Clerk of the House of Representatives

 Congressional Biographical Directory of the United States 1774–present

At-large
Former congressional districts of the United States
At-large United States congressional districts
Constituencies established in 1821
1821 establishments in Missouri
Constituencies disestablished in 1847
1847 disestablishments in Missouri
Constituencies established in 1933
1933 establishments in Missouri
Constituencies disestablished in 1935
1935 disestablishments in Missouri